The 1906 Ecuador–Colombia earthquake occurred at 10:36:10 (UTC+5) on Wednesday January 31, 1906 off the coast of Ecuador, near Esmeraldas. The earthquake had a moment magnitude of 8.8 and triggered a destructive tsunami that caused at least 500 casualties on the coast of Colombia.

Tectonic setting 
The earthquake occurred along the boundary between the Malpelo Plate, formerly considered the northeastern part of the Nazca Plate, and the North Andes Plate. The earthquake is likely to be a result of thrust-faulting, caused by the subduction of the Coiba, Malpelo and Nazca Plates beneath the North Andes and South American Plates. The coastal parts of Ecuador and Colombia have a history of strong megathrust earthquakes originating from this Malpelo-North Andes plate boundary.

Damage
The greatest damage from the tsunami occurred on the coast between Río Verde, Ecuador and Micay, Colombia. Estimates of the number of deaths caused by the tsunami vary between 500 and 1,500.

Characteristics

Earthquake
The lack of overlap between the three more recent events suggest the presence of minor barriers to rupture propagation along the plate boundary. Although these three events ruptured the same area of the plate boundary overall, they released only a small fraction of the energy of the 1906 earthquake.

Tsunami
At Hilo, Hawaii a  run-up height was recorded for this event. The tsunami was also noted in Costa Rica, Panama, Mexico, California and Japan.

Future seismic hazard
Because the sequence of three earthquakes that ended in 1979 did not release as much energy as the 1906 event, it has been suggested that an earthquake of similar magnitude to that in 1906 was likely in the near future. However, analysis of the amount of slip associated with the three later events suggest that they have released most of the accumulated displacement across the plate boundary since 1906. On 16 April 2016, a magnitude 7.8 earthquake occurred in the same area.

See also
List of earthquakes in 1906
List of earthquakes in Colombia
List of earthquakes in Ecuador

References

External links

Megathrust earthquakes in Ecuador
Megathrust earthquakes in Colombia
1906 earthquakes
1906 in Ecuador
1906 in Colombia
1906 tsunamis
January 1906 events
Tsunamis in Colombia
Tsunamis in Ecuador